A sanctuary, in its original meaning, is a sacred place, such as a shrine. By the use of such places as a haven, by extension the term has come to be used for any place of safety. This secondary use can be categorized into human sanctuary, a safe place for people, such as a political sanctuary; and non-human sanctuary, such as an animal or plant sanctuary.

Religious sanctuary 
The meaning was extended to places of holiness or safety, in particular the whole demarcated area, often many acres, surrounding a Greek or Roman temple; the original terms for these are temenos in Greek and fanum in Latin, but both may be translated as "sanctuary". Similar usage may be sometimes found describing sacred areas in other religions. In Christian churches sanctuary has a specific meaning, covering part of the interior, covered below.

Sanctuary as area around the altar

In many Western Christian traditions including Catholic, Lutheran, Methodist, and Anglican churches, the area around the altar is called the sanctuary; it is also considered holy because of the belief in the physical presence of God in the Eucharist, both during the Mass and in the church tabernacle at other times.

In many churches the architectural term chancel covers the same area as the sanctuary, and either term may be used. In some Protestant churches, the term sanctuary denotes the entire worship space while the term chancel refer only to the area around the altar-table.

In many Western traditions, altar rails and sometimes steps would demarcate the sanctuary or chancel from the rest of the building. In the Eastern Orthodox Church, Eastern Catholic Churches of Syro-Malabar Church, Byzantine rite and Coptic Orthodox Churches, the sanctuary is separated from the nave (where worshippers pray) by an iconostasis, literally a wall of icons, with three doors in it. In other Oriental Orthodox traditions, a sanctuary curtain is used.

The terminology that applies the word sanctuary to the area around the altar does not apply to Christian churches alone: King Solomon's temple, built in about 950 BC, had a sanctuary ("Holy of Holies") where the Ark of the Covenant was, and the term applies to the corresponding part of any house of worship. In most modern synagogues, the main room for prayer is known as the sanctuary, to contrast it with smaller rooms dedicated to various other services and functions. 

There is a raised bimah in the sanctuary, from which services are conducted, which is where the ark holding the Torah may reside; some synagogues, however, have a separate bimah and ark-platform.

Sanctuary as a sacred place 
In Europe, Christian churches were sometimes built on land considered to be a particularly holy spot, perhaps where a miracle or martyrdom was believed to have taken place or where a holy person was buried. Examples are St. Peter's Basilica in Rome and St. Albans Cathedral in England, which commemorate the martyrdom of Saint Peter (the first Pope) and Saint Alban (the first Christian martyr in Britain), respectively.

The place, and therefore the church built there, was considered to have been sanctified (made holy) by what happened there. In modern times, the Catholic Church has continued this practice by placing in the altar of each church, when it is consecrated for use, a box (the sepulcrum) containing relics of one or more saints, usually martyrs. This relic box is removed when the church is decommissioned as a holy space. In the Eastern Orthodox Church, the antimension on the altar serves a similar function. It is a cloth icon of Christ's body taken down from the cross, and typically has the relics of a saint sewn into it. In addition, it is signed by the parish's bishop, and represents his authorization and blessing for the Eucharist to be celebrated on that altar.

Human sanctuary

Traditions of Sanctuary 
Although the word "sanctuary" is often traced back only as far as the Greek and Roman empires, the concept itself has likely been part of human cultures for thousands of years. The idea that persecuted persons should be given a place of refuge is ancient, perhaps even primordial, deriving itself from basic features of human altruism. In studying the concept across many cultures and times, anthropologists have found sanctuary to be a highly universal notion, one which appears in almost all major religious traditions and in a variety of diverse geographies. In the Americas, many native tribes shared similar practices, particularly in the face of invading European powers. Despite tensions between groups, many tribes still offered and received sanctuary, taking in those who had fled their tribal lands or feared persecution by the Spanish, English, and French.

Legal sanctuary 
In the classical world, some (but not all) temples offered sanctuary to criminals or runaway slaves. When referring to prosecution of crimes, sanctuary can mean one of the following:

Church sanctuary

A sacred place, such as a church, in which fugitives formerly were immune to arrest (recognized by English law from the fourth to the seventeenth century). While the practice of churches offering sanctuary is still observed in the modern era, it no longer has any legal effect and is respected solely for the sake of tradition.

The term 'sanctuary' is also used to denote the part of the church which contains the main, or "high altar".

Political sanctuary
Immunity to arrest afforded by a sovereign authority. The United Nations has expanded the definition of "political" to include race, nationality, religion, political opinions and membership or participation in any particular social group or social activities. People seeking political sanctuary typically do so by asking a sovereign authority for asylum.

Right of asylum

Many ancient peoples recognized a religious right of asylum, protecting those accused of a crime from legal action and from exile to some extent. This principle was adopted by the early Christian church, and various rules developed for what the person had to do to qualify for protection and just how much protection it was.

In England, King Æthelberht made the first laws regulating sanctuary in about AD 600, though Geoffrey of Monmouth in his Historia Regum Britanniae (c. 1136) says that the legendary pre-Saxon king Dunvallo Molmutius (4th/5th century BC) enacted sanctuary laws in the Molmutine Laws as recorded by Gildas (c. 500–570). By Norman times, there had come to be two kinds of the sanctuary: churches licensed by the king had a broader version, while other churches had a lower level. The medieval system of asylum was finally abolished entirely in England by James I in 1623.

Political asylum
During the Wars of the Roses of the 15th century when the Lancastrians or Yorkists would suddenly gain the upper hand by winning a battle, some adherents of the losing side might find themselves surrounded by adherents of the winning side and unable to return to their own side, so they would rush to sanctuary at the nearest church until it was safe to leave it. A prime example is Queen Elizabeth Woodville, consort of Edward IV of England.

In 1470, when the Lancastrians briefly restored Henry VI to the throne, Edward's queen was living in London with several young daughters. She moved with them into Westminster Abbey for sanctuary, living there in royal comfort until Edward was restored to the throne in 1471 and giving birth to their first son Edward during that time. When King Edward IV died in 1483, Elizabeth (who was highly unpopular with even the Yorkists and probably did need protection) took her five daughters and youngest son (Richard, Duke of York; Prince Edward had his own household by then) and again moved into sanctuary at Westminster Abbey. She had all the comforts of home; she brought so much furniture and so many chests that the workmen had to break holes in some of the walls to move everything in fast enough to suit her.

In the 20th century, during World War I, all of Russia's Allies made the controversial decision in 1917 to deny political sanctuary to Tsar Nicholas II Romanov and his immediate family when he was overthrown in that year's February Revolution part of the Russian Revolution because of his abuses of power and forced to abdicate in March in favor of Alexander Kerensky's Russian Provisional Government. Nicholas and his family and remaining household were sent to Tobolsk, Siberia that summer while Kerensky kept Russia in the war when it couldn't win, enabling Lenin and his Bolsheviks to gain the Russian people's support in overthrowing Kerensky in that year's October Revolution. The Russian Civil War started that November and in July, 1918, with Lenin losing the civil war, Nicholas and his family were executed on Lenin's orders while confined to the Ipatiev House in Yekaterenburg. 

In 1939, months before World War II began, 937 Jewish refugees from Nazi Germany on board the MS St. Louis met the same fate, first by Cuba—their original destination—and afterwards by the United States and Canada. As a result, 620 of them were forced back to Europe, where many of them died in Nazi concentration camps during the war. This incident was the subject of Gordon Thomas' and Max Morgan-Witts' 1974 novel, Voyage of the Damned and its 1976 movie adaptation. 

In 1970, Simonas Kudirka was denied U.S. sanctuary when he attempted to defect from the then-Soviet Union by jumping from his "mother ship", 'Sovetskaya Litva', onto the USCGC Vigilant when it was sailing from New Bedford while Kudirka's ship was anchored at Martha's Vineyard. Kudrika was accused of stealing 3,000 roubles from Sovetskaya Litva's safe and when the U.S. State Department didn't help him, Kudrika was sent back to the Soviet Union, where he was convicted of treason and sentenced to ten years of hard labor but because Kudirka could claim American citizenship through his mother, he was allowed to return to the United States in 1974. His plight was the subject of Algis Ruksenas' 1973 book Day of Shame: The Truth About The Murderous Happenings Aboard the Cutter Vigilant During the Russian-American Confrontation off Martha's Vineyard and the 1978 TV movie The Defection of Simas Kudirka, starring Alan Arkin. 

Ten years later, Ukrainian youth, Walter Polovchak, became a cause célèbre in the 1980s because of his request in 1980 at age 12 to remain in the United States permanently after announcing that he didn't want to return with his parents to what was then Soviet Ukraine, and was the subject of a five-year struggle between U.S. and Soviet courts over his fate, which was decided in his favor in 1985 when Walter turned 18 that October 3 and was no longer a juvenile and thus no longer required to return to the Soviet Union if he didn't want to. 

Later in the 1980s, Estonian national and alleged Nazi war criminal, Karl Linnas, was the target of several sanctuary denials outside the United States before he was finally returned in 1987 to the then-USSR to face a highly likely death penalty for alleged war crimes that he was convicted of in 1962 (see Holocaust trials in Soviet Estonia). Linnas died of a heart attack in a Leningrad prison hospital on July 2, 1987, while waiting for a possible retrial in Gorbachev's courts, 25 years after Khrushchev's courts convicted him in absentia.

Sanctuary versus asylum 
The concepts of sanctuary and asylum are defined very similarly at their most basic level. Both terms involve the granting of safety or protection from some type of danger, often implied to be a persecuting, oppressive power. The divergence between these terms stems primarily from their societal associations and legal standing; while asylum understood in its political sense implies legally-binding protection on the part of a state entity, sanctuary often takes the form of moral and ethical activism that calls into question decisions made by the institutions in power.

In many instances, the sanctuary is not incorporated into the law but operated in defiance of it. Efforts to create a sanctuary for the persecuted or oppressed are often undertaken by organizations, religious or otherwise, who work outside of mainstream avenues to ameliorate what they see as deficiencies in the existing policy. Though these attempts to provide sanctuary have no legal standing, they can be effective in catalyzing change at community, local, and even regional levels. Sanctuary can also be integrated into these levels of government through "Sanctuary bills", which designate cities and sometimes states as safe spaces for immigrants deemed "illegal" by the federal government. These bills work to limit the cooperation of local and regional governments with the national government's efforts to enforce immigration law. In recognition of their progressiveness and boldness in the face of perceived injustice, "Sanctuary bills" are commonly referred to as "activist law".

Sanctuary in contemporary society 

For the last few centuries, it has become less common to invoke sanctuary as a means of protecting persecuted peoples. Yet, the 1980s saw a massive resurgence of cases as part of the U.S.-Central American sanctuary movement. This resurgence was part of a broader anti-war movement that emerged to protest U.S. foreign policy in Central America. The movement grew out of the sanctuary practices of political and religious organizations in both the United States and Central America. It was initially sparked by immigrant rights organizations in well-established Central American communities. These organizations first opposed U.S. foreign policy in Central America and then shifted towards aiding an ever-increasing number of Central Americans refugees. Working in tandem, immigrant rights organizations and churches created many new organizations that provided housing and legal services for newly arrived immigrants. These organizations also advocated for the creation of sanctuary spaces for those fleeing war and oppression in their home countries. By 1987, 440 cities in the United States had been declared "sanctuary cities" open to migrants from civil wars in Central America.

The immigrant-religious organization partnerships of the sanctuary movement remain active, providing essential services to immigrant populations. Particularly notable in recent years is their legal and advocacy work. By providing legal representation to asylum seekers who may not be able to afford it, these organizations give their clients a better chance of winning their respective cases. As of 2008, detained asylum seekers with legal representation were six times more likely to win their cases for asylum, and non-detained asylum seekers with representation were almost three times more likely to win asylum compared with those without it. The pro bono legal services provided by these organizations also work to alleviate stress on an adjudication system that is already overloaded with cases—a 2014 study of the system showed that about 250 asylum officers at any one time are tasked with interviewing an average of 28,000 asylum seekers. These sanctuary-based organizations also engage in larger-scale advocacy work that allows them to reach immigrant populations beyond the communities they work in. According to a study done by the "New Sanctuary Movement" organization, at least 600,000 people in the United States have at least one family member in danger of deportation. Legislative and judicial advocacy work at the regional and even national level allows organizations to support this group of people by influencing policy.

From the 1980s continuing into the 2000s, there also have been instances of immigrant rights organizations and churches providing "sanctuary" for short periods to migrants facing deportation in Germany, France, Belgium, the Netherlands, Norway, Switzerland, Australia and Canada, among other nations. In 2007, Iranian refugee Shahla Valadi was granted asylum in Norway after spending seven years in church sanctuary after the initial denial of asylum. From 1983 to 2003 Canada experienced 36 sanctuary incidents. In 2016, an Icelandic church declared that they would harbor two failed asylum seekers who violated the Dublin Regulation, and police removed them for deportation, as ecclesiastical immunity has no legal standing.

Other uses 
When referring to a shelter from danger or hardship, sanctuary can mean one of the following:
Shelter sanctuary
A place offering protection and safety; a shelter, typically used by displaced persons, refugees, and homeless people.

Humanitarian sanctuary
A source of help, relief, or comfort in times of trouble typically used by victims of war and disaster.
Institutional sanctuary
An institution for the care of people, especially those with physical or mental impairments, who require organized supervision or assistance.
Work Sanctuary
A place where an individual can work safely and in a natural environment 
The term "sanctuary" has further come to be applied to any space set aside for private use in which others are not supposed to intrude, such as a "man cave".

Non-human sanctuary

Animal sanctuary 

An animal sanctuary is a facility where animals are brought to live and be protected for the rest of their lives. Unlike animal shelters, sanctuaries do not seek to place animals with individuals or groups, instead maintaining each animal until its natural death.

Plant sanctuary 

Plant sanctuaries are areas set aside to maintain functioning natural ecosystems, to act as refuges for species and to maintain ecological processes that cannot survive in most intensely managed landscapes and seascapes. Protected areas act as benchmarks against which we understand human interactions with the natural world.

See also
Asylum (antiquity)
Cities of Refuge
Church asylum
Elvira Arellano
Frith
Hospitality
Hospitality law
 Hospitium
 Proxeny
 Xenia (Greek)
La Iglesia de Nuestra Señora la Reina de los Ángeles
Shrine
Marian shrine

References

Further reading
 J. Charles Cox (1911). The Sanctuaries and Sanctuary Seekers of Medieval England On Archive.org
 John Bellamy (1973). Crime and Public Order in England in the Later Middle Ages.
 Richard Kaeuper (1982). "Right of asylum". Dictionary of the Middle Ages. v.1 pp. 632–633.

External links
Sanctuary Movement history on New Standards
Sanctuary in church architecture –  from the Catholic Encyclopedia
Sanctuary as a place of refuge –  from the Catholic Encyclopedia

Safe houses
Shrines
Social institutions
Articles containing video clips